This is a list of National Historic Landmarks in Colorado. There are 26 National Historic Landmarks in Colorado, two of which extend into New Mexico.


National Historic Landmarks in Colorado

|}

See also

Bibliography of Colorado
Index of Colorado-related articles
Outline of Colorado
History of Colorado
List of protected areas of Colorado

References

External links

Colorado state government website
History Colorado website
United States federal government website
United States Department of the Interior website
National Park Service website
National Historic Landmarks

 
Colorado geography-related lists
Colorado history-related lists
Lists of buildings and structures in Colorado
Tourist attractions in Colorado
Colorado, List of national historic landmarks in